Zou huo ru mo or  is a Chinese-culture concept traditionally used to indicate that something has gone wrong in spiritual or martial arts training. The qigong community uses this term to describe a physiological or psychological disorder believed to result during or after qigong practice, due to "improper practice" of qigong and other self-cultivation techniques. The concept was highlighted in the social and political context of mass popularization of qigong in China. The Buddhist or Taoist community also uses this term when referring to people who practice esoteric techniques or meditation without the proper guidance of a teacher.

Background

The Chinese word zǒuhuǒrùmó ( "①be obsessed with sth. ②possessed by the Devil") combines zǒuhuǒ(r) ("①〈elec.〉 ⓐspark ⓑhave a short circuit ②〈coll.〉 discharge (a firearm) accidentally ③overstate ④catch fire; be on fire") and rùmó ("①be spellbound ②be infatuated/obsessed"). In recent times this syndrome has been known as  The term has traditionally been applied to indicate that something has gone wrong in one's martial arts training, interpreted as "imbalance of qi (life energy)".

In more recent history, the term has been applied to refer to undesirable somatic or psychological effects experienced during or after the practice of the broad range of Chinese self-cultivation exercises known as qigong. Most cases do not last for an extended period of time, and are never brought to medical attention.

While qigong could potentially act as a stressor in some vulnerable individuals, relations between qigong and disorders are manifold, and causal relationships have not been demonstrated.  Similar syndromes have been observed in other forms of self-cultivation practices such as yoga (Kundalini syndrome), meditation, and hypnosis.

Symptoms

Symptoms are often identified as being in one of three categories: 
 panic, discomfort, and uncontrolled spontaneous movement;
 sensory problems, such as visual or auditory hallucination; and 
 irrational beliefs.

Somatic symptoms can include sensations and pain in head, chest and back, abdomen, limbs, or whole body; whereas, mental and emotional symptoms can include neurasthenia, affective disorder, self-consciousness, hallucination, and paranoia. This is also said to happen to esoteric practioners and sorcerers who do not properly cultivate.

Diagnosis
While the Chinese Society of Psychiatry prefers the term "qigong deviation", the American Psychiatric Association uses psychosis terminology. Some physicians believe that this disease can be categorized as a culture-bound syndrome, but this point is debated.

Chinese psychiatry
In the second edition of the Chinese Classification of Mental Disorders (CCMD-2) published by the Chinese Society of Psychiatry the diagnosis of “Qigong Deviation Syndrome” is based upon the following criteria:
 The subject being demonstrably normal before doing qigong exercises
 Psychological and physiological reactions appearing during or after qigong exercises (suggestion and autosuggestion may play an important role in these reactions)
 Complaints of abnormal sensations during or after qigong exercises
 Diagnostic criteria do not meet other mental disorders such as schizophrenia, affective disorder, and neurosis.

Western psychiatry

In the West, there was no equivalent experience until the adoption of qigong practices by the public became more common. When the Western medical community encountered abnormal conditions presenting in patients practicing qigong, they used the term "Qi-gong psychotic reaction" and classified the disorder as a culture-bound syndrome in the 4th edition of the Diagnostic and Statistical Manual (DSM-IV) of the American Psychiatric Association. It is described as

In order to diagnose this disease in the West, practitioners determine the cultural formation of the patient; this includes their cultural reference group and how that culture might explain their illness.

The DSM-IV classification has been criticized by other Western psychiatrists on the grounds that

Medical causes

The appearance of symptoms during or after qigong practice has been explained in various ways by the psychiatric community, in severe cases as an indication of latent psychosis. The Chinese medical literature includes a wider variety of symptoms associated with qigong deviation; the non-psychotic symptoms correspond to conversion disorder and histrionic personality disorder in Western classifications.

Latent psychosis
In cases of psychosis, a Western psychiatric belief is that qigong could be a precipitating stressor of a latent psychotic disorder to which the patient is predisposed, rather than erroneous qigong practice; a type of reactive psychosis or the precipitation of an underlying mental illness, such as schizophrenia, bipolar disorder, or posttraumatic stress disorder.

Qigong community perspective

Within the qigong community, Zou huo ru mo is believed to be caused by improper practice:
 Inexperienced or unqualified instructor
 Incorrect instructions
 Impatience
 Becoming frightened, irritated, confused, or suspicious during the course of qigong practice
 Inappropriate focus, interpreted as "inappropriate channeling of qi (life energy)."

Treatment
Within the qigong community, there are specific treatments believed to be effective for addressing different forms of Zou huo ru mo. In particular, depending upon somatic versus psychological symptoms, and whether the condition is considered temporary or an intrinsic mental disorder, self-correction treatments can involve relaxation, walking, self-vibrating, self-patting, and self-massage. Clinical treatments can involve psychological counseling, expert guidance of practice, acupuncture, massage, "external qi" treatments, and symptomatic correction.

Social and political context

Qigong deviation became part of political controversy during the 1990s, when the Chinese government became concerned about loss of state control due to widespread popularity of qigong, mass practice, and rise to power of charismatic qigong "grandmasters".

References

Chinese martial arts
Chinese words and phrases
Culture-bound syndromes
Meditation